Marginella is a very large genus of small tropical and temperate sea snails, marine gastropod molluscs in the subfamily Marginellinae of the family Marginellidae, the margin snails.  It is the type genus of the family.

The shells of species in this genus are rounded, smooth and glossy, with a large aperture that appears to be toothed because it shows the edge of the columellar folds. In many species the shells are colorful. The glossy surface of the shell results from the fact that the mantle covers most of the shell when the animal is active. As is typical in the Neogastropoda, the animal has a long siphon. When the animal is active, the foot extends much further out than the edge of the shell.

As is also typical for the Neogastropoda, species in this genus are carnivorous and predatory.

Etymology
Marginella means "little margin".

Shell description
The shells of the species in this genus have spires which range from moderately elevated to flattened. The surface of the shell is glossy and porcellaneous, and it is often but not always colourful. The columella has four definite, subequal plaits on its anterior half. The outer lip is thickened, and generally denticulate inside, with distinct teeth or folds. The siphonal canal is not deeply incised.

There is no operculum.

Description of the soft parts
In the living animal, the mantle only partly extends over the shell when the animal is moving.

The head is bifurcated, with slender tentacles and eyes in small bulges lateral to the base of tentacles.  The siphon is large and protrudes over the head. The foot is large and flat, and when it is extended is slightly longer than the shell.

Ecology

Distribution
This genus is found in tropical and temperate seas worldwide.

Species
Species within the genus Marginella include:

 Marginella adamasoides Lussi, 2013
 Marginella adamkusi Bozzetti, 1994
 Marginella aequinoctialis Boyer & Simbille, 2004
 Marginella aikeni V. Veldsman & S. G. Veldsman, 2012
 Marginella albidens R. Aiken, 2019
 Marginella albocincta Sowerby, 1846
 Marginella alborubra Rosado & Monteiro, 2015
 Marginella albospira S. G. Veldsman, 2013
 Marginella aliwalensis S. G. Veldsman, 2013
 Marginella amazona Bavay, 1912
 Marginella amirantensis Boyer & Rosado, 2019
 Marginella anapaulae Massier, 2004
 Marginella anna Jousseaume, 1881
 † Marginella antepiperata R. Aiken, 2020 
 Marginella arcana S. G. Veldsman, Aiken & J. H. Veldsman, 2014
 † Marginella arena Cotton, 1949 
 Marginella aronnax Bouchet & Warén, 1985
 Marginella aurantia Lamarck, 1822
 Marginella bairstowi Sowerby, 1886
 Marginella bavayi Dautzenberg, 1910
 Marginella belcheri Hinds, 1844
 Marginella benthedii Boyer & Rosado, 2019
 Marginella bicatenata Sowerby, 1914
 Marginella britoi Rolán & Gori, 2014
 Marginella broderickae Hayes, 2001
 Marginella carlae S. G. Veldsman, 2013
 Marginella carmenae Ortega & Gofas, 2019
 Marginella carquejai Gofas & Fernandes, 1994
 Marginella catenata Boyer & Rosado, 2019
 Marginella caterinae Bozzetti, 1991
 Marginella celestae Massier & Rosado, 2008
 Marginella celosia S. G. Veldsman, 2021
 Marginella chalmersi Tomlin & Shackleford, 1912
 † Marginella charma Cotton, 1949 
 Marginella circumflexa S. G. Veldsman, 2021
 Marginella claustra Boyer & Rosado, 2019
 † Marginella clenchi M. Smith, 1936 
 Marginella cleryi Petit De La Saussaye, 1836
 † Marginella clima Cotton, 1949 
 Marginella cloveri Rios & Matthews, 1972
 Marginella colombi T. Cossignani, 2012
 Marginella colomborum (Bozzetti, 1995)
 Marginella confortinii Bozzetti, 1992
 Marginella confusa R. Aiken, 2019
 Marginella coronata Boyer & Rosado, 2019
 Marginella cosmia Bartsch, 1915
 Marginella croceus S. G. Veldsman, 2015
 Marginella croukampi Hayes, 1996
 Marginella davisae S. G. Veldsman, 2021
 † Marginella deshayesi Michelotti, 1847 
 Marginella desjardini Marche-Marchad, 1957
 Marginella diadochus Adams & Reeve, 1848
 Marginella dimidiata Thiele, 1925
 Marginella donaikeni S. G. Veldsman, J. H. Veldsman & R. Aiken, 2016
 Marginella edwardensis S. G. Veldsman, 2013
 Marginella elegans T. Cossignani, 2021
 Marginella elegantissima S. G. Veldsman, 2021
 Marginella elephantina S. G. Veldsman, 2013
 Marginella emmae Bozzetti, 1998
 Marginella epipolia Tomlin, 1921
 Marginella eucosmia Bartsch, 1915
 Marginella evansorum V. Veldsman, S.G. Veldsman & Aiken, 2012
 Marginella everriculum S. G. Veldsman, 2018
 Marginella exigua S. G. Veldsman, 2021
 Marginella falsebayensis V. Velsdman & S. G. Veldsman, 2012
 Marginella felixi Massier, 2004
 Marginella festiva Kiener, 1841
 Marginella fimbriata Boyer & Rosado, 2019
 Marginella fishhoenkensis Massier, 2004
 Marginella floccata Sowerby, 1889
 † Marginella formosa M. Smith, 1946
 Marginella fraserorum Aiken, 2014
 Marginella fulvocincta W. H. Turton, 1932
 Marginella fuscopicta W. H. Turton, 1932
 Marginella gabrielae Bozzetti, 1998
 Marginella gemma Adams, 1850
 Marginella gemmula Bavay in Dautzenberg, 1913
 Marginella gennesi H. Fisher, 1901
 Marginella geraldi Lussi, 2006
 Marginella gilva Goud & Neefs, 1996
 † Marginella giuntellii Sosso, Brunetti & Dell'Angelo, 2015
 Marginella glabella (Linnaeus, 1758)
 Marginella gloriosa Jousseaume, 1884
 † Marginella goncalvesi R. Aiken, 2020 
 Marginella goodalli Sowerby, 1825
 Marginella gracilenta S. G. Veldsman, 2015
 Marginella gustavoi Pérez-Dionis, Ortea & Espinosa, 2009
 Marginella harveyorum R. Aiken, 2019
 Marginella hayesi Bozzetti, 1993
 Marginella helmatina Rang, 1832
 Marginella henrikasi Bozzetti, 1995
 Marginella hernandezi Rolán & Gori, 2014
 Marginella himburgae Massier & Zettler, 2009
 † Marginella hordeacea Tate, 1878 
 Marginella houtbaaiensis S. G. Veldsman, 2013
 Marginella huberti Clover, 1972
 Marginella hybrida Cossignani, 2006
 Marginella ignifer S. G. Veldsman, 2017
 Marginella immelmani Hart M., 2001
 Marginella impudica P. Fischer, 1883
 Marginella irrorata Menke, 1828
 Marginella jeffreysbayensis S. G. Veldsman, 2017
 Marginella joanae Bozzetti, 2001
 Marginella joanmassierae Bozzetti, 1992
 Marginella joostei Liltved & Millard, 1994
 Marginella keiensis S. G. Veldsman, 2017
 Marginella jucunda S. G. Veldsman, 2017 
 Marginella kilburni Lussi, 2013
 Marginella lamarcki Boyer, 2004
 Marginella lateritia Melvill & Sykes, 1903
 Marginella lauriesmithi S. G. Veldsman, 2020
 Marginella lemaitrei Liltved & Millard, 1994
 Marginella leoi S. G. Veldsman, 2013
 Marginella limbata Lamarck, 1822
 Marginella lindae S. G. Veldsman, 2013
 Marginella lineatolabrum Gaskoin, 1840
 Marginella lineofasciata Bozzetti, 1992
 Marginella lineolata Sowerby, 1886
 Marginella liparozona Tomlin & Shackleford, 1913
 Marginella lucani Jousseaume, 1884
 Marginella luculenta Gofas & Fernandes, 1994
 Marginella lussii Hayes & Millard, 1995
 Marginella lutea Sowerby, 1889
 Marginella maculata S. G. Veldsman, 2013
 † Marginella mala Cotton, 1949 
 Marginella malva S. G. Veldsman, 2021
 Marginella manzimtotiensis S. G. Veldsman, 2017
 Marginella mariaodetai Cossignani, 2010
 Marginella mariaodeteae Cossignani, 2014
 Marginella marimba Gofas & Fernandes, 1994
 Marginella marocana Locard, 1897
 Marginella martiae S. G. Veldsman, 2017
 Marginella mattavellii T. Cossignani, 2021
 Marginella mattheeorum V. Veldsman, S. G. Veldsman & Aiken, 2012
 Marginella mauretanica Boyer & Neefs, 1999
 Marginella mbotyiensis Aiken, 2014 
 Marginella melvilli Tomlin & Shackleford, 1913
 Marginella michelae T. Cossignani, 2012
 Marginella millardi Lussi, 1993
 Marginella miniroseolineata R. Aiken, 2019
 Marginella minuscula (Turton, 1932)
 Marginella mirandai Rolán & Gori, 2014
 Marginella monicae Bozzetti, 1997
 Marginella monozona Turton, 1932
 Marginella mooi R. Aiken, 2019
 Marginella mosaica Sowerby, 1846
 Marginella mosterti S. G. Veldsman, R. Aiken & J. H. Veldsman, 2017
 Marginella munda E.A. Smith, 1904
 Marginella musica Hinds, 1844
 Marginella mzimayiensis S. G. Veldsman, Aiken & J. H. Veldsman, 2015
 Marginella natalcinerea Massier, 1993
 Marginella nebulosa ( in Röding, 1798)
 Marginella nevillana Kilburn, 1977
 Marginella nigromaculata S. G. Veldsman, 2017
 Marginella nimbosa S. G. Veldsman, 2013
 Marginella nkwaziensis S. G. Veldsman, 2017
 Marginella obliqua S. G. Veldsman, Aiken & J. H. Veldsman, 2014
 Marginella olearegina S. G. Veldsman, 2020
 Marginella olivarum S. G. Veldsman & J. H. Veldsman, 2015
 Marginella ornata Redfield, 1870
 Marginella orstomi Coomans, 1975
 Marginella pachista Tomlin 1913
 Marginella palleukos Aiken, 2014
 Marginella parkrynieensis V. Veldsman, S. G. Veldsman & Aiken, 2012
 Marginella peelae Bozzetti, 1993
 Marginella perelegans S. G. Veldsman, 2021
 Marginella persicum S. G. Veldsman, 2017
 Marginella petitii Duval, 1841
 Marginella philipi S. G. Veldsman, 2013
 Marginella picturata G. Nevill & H. Nevill, 1874
 Marginella piperata Hinds, 1844
 Marginella pokkiae J. H. Veldsman & S. G. Veldsman, 2021
 Marginella pondo S. G. Veldsman, 2017
 Marginella poppei Boyer & Neefs, 1999
 Marginella praeclara S. G. Veldsman, 2021
 Marginella procera Boyer & Rosado, 2019
 Marginella pseudocleryi T. Cossignani, 2021
 Marginella pseudodesjardini Le Béon, 2012
 Marginella pseudoglabella Mattavelli, 2018
 Marginella pseudopachista Aiken, 2014
 † Marginella pseudopoppei R. Aiken, 2020 
 Marginella pseudornata Bozzetti, 1992
 Marginella pseudorosea S. G. Veldsman, 2013
 Marginella pseudosebastiani Mattavelli, 2001
 Marginella pulex Ortega & Gofas, 2019
 Marginella punctilineata E.A. Smith, 1899
 Marginella puniceus S. G. Veldsman, 2014
 Marginella purpurea Cossignani, 2006
 † Marginella regula Cotton, 1949 
 Marginella richardsbayensis Lussi, 2013
 Marginella rosadialeukos Aiken, 2014
 Marginella rosea Lamarck, 1822
 Marginella roseafasciata Massier, 1993
 Marginella roseaflavescens S. G. Veldsman, J. H. Veldsman & Aiken, 2016 
 Marginella roseolineata Turton, 1932
 Marginella rubescens S. G. Veldsman, 2017
 Marginella rubrocincta Turton, 1932
 Marginella rubrovittata S. G. Veldsman, J. H. Veldsman & R. Aiken, 2016
 Marginella rutila Boyer & Rosado, 2019
 Marginella sagena S. G. Veldsman, 2018
 Marginella san S.G. Veldsman, 2014
 Marginella schepmani Tomlin, 1916
 Marginella scitula W. H. Turton, 1932
 Marginella sebastiani Marche-Marchad & Rosso, 1979
 Marginella seccombei Wakefield, 2012
 † Marginella seguenzai La Perna & Vazzana, 2016 
 Marginella senegalensis Clover, 1990
 Marginella sergioi Bozzetti, 1997
 Marginella shellyensis S. G. Veldsman, 2021
 Marginella signata Boyer & Rosado, 2019
 Marginella sima S. G. Veldsman, 2021
 Marginella simulata Gofas & Fernandes, 1994
 Marginella singularis S. G. Veldsman, 2016
 Marginella slateri Lussi, 2017
 Marginella sodwanaensis S. G. Veldsman, 2021
 Marginella spadix S. G. Veldsman, 2016 
 Marginella spengleri Aiken, 2014
 Marginella spinacia Gofas & Fernandes, 1988
 Marginella spiralineata B.Hayes, 1994
 Marginella squamosa Boyer & Rosado, 2019
 † Marginella stephaniae Pereira da Costa, 1866 
 Marginella stephmani V. Veldsman & Aiken, 2012
 Marginella storea Boyer & Rosado, 2019
 † Marginella strombiformis Tenison Woods, 1877 
 Marginella stuarti Kilburn, 1977
 Marginella subturrita P. Fischer, 1883
 Marginella sulizeae S. G. Veldsman & J. H. Veldsman, 2015
 Marginella susanae Veldsman & Jooste, 2009
 Marginella svevae Cossignani, 2014
 Marginella tagaroae R. Aiken, 2019
 † Marginella talla Cotton, 1949
 Marginella tentoria Lussi, 2013
 Marginella tenuiparva R. Aiken, 2019
 Marginella textilis S. G. Veldsman & J. H. Veldsman, 2014
 Marginella thos S. G. Veldsman, 2013
 Marginella tomlini Shackleford, 1916
 Marginella trafalgarensis R. Aiken, 2019
 Marginella transkeiensis S. G. Veldsman, 2013
 Marginella trixiae V. Veldsman & S. G. Veldsman, 2013
 Marginella tugelaensis S. G. Veldsman, 2017
 Marginella tuguriana Lussi, 1993
 Marginella umgababaensis S. G. Veldsman, 2021
 Marginella umkomaasensis S. G. Veldsman, 2021
 Marginella umlaasiana S. G. Veldsman, 2017
 Marginella umzumbeensis S. G. Veldsman, Aiken & J. H. Veldsman, 2016 
 Marginella undulans Gofas & Fernandes, 1994
 Marginella valae S. G. Veldsman, 2020
 Marginella velai T. Cossignani & Ahuir, 2020
 Marginella velliesi S. G. Veldsman & Aiken, 2015
 Marginella venteri R. Aiken, 2019
 Marginella verdascai Hayes & Rosado, 2007
 Marginella verrilli Morrison, 1967
 Marginella vexillum Redfield, 1852
 Marginella vidalensis S. G. Veldsman, 2017
 Marginella viljoenae S. G. Veldsman, 2013
 Marginella wallaceorum Lussi, 2013
 Marginella werneri Bozzetti, 1993
 Marginella westhuizeni Massier, 1993
 † Marginella woodsi Tate, 1878 
 Marginella xhosa Liltved & Millard, 1994
 Marginella xoraensis R. Aiken, 2019
 Marginella zebroides S. G. Veldsman, 2013
 Marginella zulu S. G. Veldsman, 2017
 † Marginella zwartkopsensis R. Aiken, 2020 

Species inquirenda (species of doubtful identity needing further investigation.)
 Marginella claudoni Bavay, date unknown:
 Marginella decaryi Bavay, 1920:
 Marginella delphinica Bavay, 1920:
 Marginella dispoliata Jousseaume, 1922 
 Marginella peasii Reeve, 1865
 Marginella scalariformis Duclos, date unknown:
 Marginella terverianella Bavay, 1922 
 Marginella virgula Jousseaume, 1922:

Nomen dubium, i.e. a name of unknown or doubtful application
 Marginella granum Philippi, 1849:
 Marginella indistincta W. H. Turton, 193
 Marginella pyrrha W. H. Turton, 1932

Species brought into synonymy

 Marginella abbreviata C. B. Adams, 1850: synonym of Volvarina abbreviata (C. B. Adams, 1850)
 Marginella adansoni Kiener, 1834: synonym of Glabella adansoni (Kiener, 1834)
 Marginella adela Thiele, 1925: synonym of Volvarina adela (Thiele, 1925)
 Marginella affinis Reeve, 1865: synonym of Volvarina affinis (Reeve, 1865)
 Marginella agapeta Watson, 1886: synonym of Gibberula agapeta (Watson, 1886)
 Marginella alabaster Reeve, 1865: synonym of Volvarina fauna (G.B. Sowerby I, 1846)
 Marginella albanyana Gaskoin, 1853: synonym of Hyalina lucida (Marrat, 1877)
 Marginella albescens Hutton, 1873: synonym of Volvarina albescens (Hutton, 1873)
 Marginella albida Tate, 1878: synonym of Hydroginella vincentiana (Cotton, 1944)
 Marginella albina Gaskoin, 1853: synonym of Mesoginella turbinata (G. B. Sowerby II, 1846)
 Marginella albino (Laseron, 1957): synonym of Alaginella albino Laseron, 1957
 Marginella albolineata d'Orbigny, 1842: synonym of Volvarina albolineata (d'Orbigny, 1842)
 Marginella albuminosa Dall, 1919: synonym of Prunum albuminosa (Dall, 1919)
 Marginella alfredensis Bartsch, 1915: synonym of Plesiocystiscus alfredensis (Bartsch, 1915)
 Marginella algoensis E. A. Smith, 1901: synonym of Crithe algoensis (E. A. Smith, 1901)
 Marginella almo Bartsch, 1915: synonym of Gibberula almo (Bartsch, 1915)
 Marginella altilabra May, 1911: synonym of Mesoginella altilabra (May, 1911)
 Marginella amabilis Redfield, 1852: synonym of Prunum amabile (Redfield, 1852)
 Marginella ambigua Bavay in Dautzenberg, 1912: synonym of Volvarina ampelusica Monterosato, 1906
 Marginella ameliensis Tomlin, 1917: synonym of Volvarina ameliensis (Tomlin, 1917)
 Marginella amianta Dall, 1889: synonym of Granulina amianta (Dall, 1889)
 Marginella amoena Suter, 1908: synonym of Dentimargo amoena (Suter, 1908): synonym of Dentimargo amoenus (Suter, 1908)
 Marginella amphitrite W. H. Turton, 1932: synonym of Cystiscus aphanacme (Tomlin, 1918) (junior synonym)
 Marginella amphora Laseron, 1948: synonym of Cystiscus angasi (Crosse, 1870)
 Marginella amydrozona Melvill: synonym of Balanetta amydrozona (Melvill, 1906)
 Marginella amygdala Kiener, 1841: synonym of Prunum amygdalum (Kiener, 1841)
 Marginella ancilloides Turton, 1932: synonym of Marginella piperata Hinds, 1844
 Marginella angasi Crosse, 1870: synonym of Cystiscus angasi (Crosse, 1870)
 Marginella anglica Leach, 1852: synonym of Trivia arctica (Pulteney, 1799)
 Marginella angolensis Odhner, 1923: synonym of Volvarina angolensis (Odhner, 1923)
 Marginella angustata Sowerby, 1846: synonym of Volvarina angustata (G.B. Sowerby, 1846)
 Marginella annulata Reeve, 1865: synonym of Prunum annulatum (Reeve, 1865)
 Marginella anticlea Dall, 1919: synonym of Dentimargo anticlea (Dall, 1919)
 Marginella anxia Hedley, 1909: synonym of Granulina anxia (Hedley, 1909)
 Marginella aphanacme Tomlin, 1918: synonym of Cystiscus aphanacme (Tomlin, 1918)
 Marginella aphanospira Tomlin, 1913: synonym of Plesiocystiscus aphanospira (Tomlin, 1913)
 Marginella apicina Menke, 1828: synonym of Prunum apicinum (Menke, 1828)
 Marginella asra Liltved & Millard, 1994: synonym of Marginella westhuizeni Massier, 1993
 Marginella atractus Tomlin, 1918: synonym of Alaginella atracta (Tomlin, 1918)
 Marginella attenuata Weinkauff, 1879: synonym of Austroginella translucida (G. B. Sowerby II, 1846)
 Marginella attenuata Reeve, 1865: synonym of Volvarina attenuata (Reeve, 1865)
 Marginella augusta Thiele, 1925: synonym of Prunum augusta (Thiele, 1925)
 Marginella aupouria Powell, 1937: synonym of Mesoginella aupouria (Powell, 1937)
 Marginella aurata Bavay in Dautzenberg, 1912: synonym of Gibberula aurata (Bavay in Dautzenberg, 1912)
 Marginella aurelia Thiele, 1925: synonym of Alaginella zeyheri (Krauss, 1852)
 Marginella aureocincta Stearns, 1872: synonym of Dentimargo aureocinctus (Stearns, 1872)
 Marginella auriculata Ménard de la Groye, 1811: synonym of Ringicula auriculata (Ménard de la Groye, 1811)
 Marginella australis Hinds, 1844: synonym of Mesoginella australis (Hinds, 1844)
 Marginella avena Kiener, 1834: synonym of Volvarina avena (Kiener, 1834)
 Marginella avenacea auct.: synonym of Prunum bellulum (Dall, 1890)
 Marginella avenella Dall, 1881: synonym of Volvarina avenella (Dall, 1881)
 Marginella barnardi Tomlin, 1919: synonym of Gibberula differens (E. A. Smith, 1904)
 Marginella baudensis E. A. Smith, 1899: synonym of Protoginella lavigata (Brazier, 1877)
 Marginella beali McGinty, 1940: synonym of Prunum beali (McGinty, 1940)
 Marginella becki Turton, 1933: synonym of Marginella piperata Hinds, 1844
 Marginella belangeri Kiener, 1834: synonym of Bullata bullata (Born, 1778)
 Marginella bella auct.: synonym of Volvarina lactea (Kiener, 1841): synonym of Volvarina abbreviata (C. B. Adams, 1850)
 Marginella bella auct.: synonym of Prunum bellulum (Dall, 1890)
 Marginella bellii Sowerby II, 1846: synonym of Glabella bellii (G.B. Sowerby II, 1846)
 Marginella beltmani Hart, 1993: synonym of Marginella peelae Bozzetti, 1993
 Marginella bensoni Reeve, 1865: synonym of Gibberula bensoni (Reeve, 1865)
 Marginella bernardi Largilliert, 1845: synonym of Cryptospira strigata (Dillwyn, 1817)
 Marginella beyerleana Bernardi, 1853: synonym of Volvarina avena (Kiener, 1834)
 Marginella biannulata (Fabricius, 1826): synonym of Volvarina bilineata (Krauss, 1848)
 Marginella bifasciata Lamarck, 1822: synonym of Glabella bifasciata (Lamarck, 1822)
 Marginella binotata Sykes, 1905: synonym of Dentimargo binotata (Sykes, 1905)
 Marginella biplicata Krauss, 1852: synonym of Hyalina perla (Marrat, 1876)
 Marginella biplicata Risso, 1826: synonym of Ringicula auriculata (Ménard de la Groye, 1811)
 Marginella bivaricosa Lamarck, 1822: synonym of Prunum marginatum (Born, 1778)
 Marginella bivittata Bavay in Dautzenberg, 1912: synonym of Volvarina ameliensis (Tomlin, 1917)
 Marginella blanda Hinds, 1844: synonym of Persicula blanda (Hinds, 1844)
 Marginella bojadorensis Thiele, 1925: synonym of Dentimargo bojadorensis (Thiele, 1925)
 Marginella borbonica Jousseaume, 1875: synonym of Dentimargo pumila (Redfield, 1870)
 Marginella borda Cotton, 1944: synonym of Alaginella borda (Cotton, 1944)
 Marginella borealis Verrill, 1884: synonym of Prunum boreale (A. E. Verrill, 1884)
 Marginella bougei Bavay, 1917: synonym of Cystiscus bougei (Bavay, 1917)
 Marginella brachia Watson, 1886: synonym of Mesoginella brachia (Watson, 1886)
 Marginella brocktoni Shackleford, 1914: synonym of Hyalina brocktoni (Shackleford, 1914)
 Marginella bucca Tomlin, 1916: synonym of Cystiscus bucca (Tomlin, 1916)
 Marginella bullula Reeve, 1865: synonym of Volvarina bullula (Reeve, 1865)
 Marginella burchardi Dunker, 1852: synonym of Prunum sapotilla (Hinds, 1844)
 Marginella burnupi Sowerby, 1897: synonym of Gibberula burnupi (G.B. Sowerby III, 1897)
 Marginella caducocincta May, 1915: synonym of Mesoginella caducocincta (May, 1915)
 Marginella caelata Monterosato, 1877: synonym of Gibberula caelata (Monterosato, 1877)
 Marginella cairoma Brookes, 1924: synonym of Dentimargo cairoma (Brookes, 1924)
 Marginella calameli Jousseaume, 1875: synonym of Volvarina mitrella (Risso, 1826)
 Marginella canaryensis Clover, 1972: synonym of Persicula canaryensis (Clover, 1972)
 Marginella candida Bivona Ant., 1832: synonym of Ringicula auriculata (Ménard de la Groye, 1811)
 Marginella capensis Krauss, 1848: synonym of Volvarina capensis (Krauss, 1848)
 Marginella caribaea d'Orbigny, 1842: synonym of Prunum apicinum (Menke, 1828)
 Marginella carinata E. A. Smith, 1891: synonym of Alaginella carinata (E. A. Smith, 1891)
 Marginella carnea Storer, 1837: synonym of Prunum carneum (Storer, 1837)
 Marginella carybaea Weinkauff, 1879: synonym of Prunum apicinum (Menke, 1828)
 Marginella castanea Dillwyn, 1817: synonym of Marginella aurantia Lamarck, 1822
 Marginella cernita Locard, 1897: synonym of Volvarina cernita (Locard, 1897)
 Marginella chemnitzii (Dillwyn, 1817): synonym of Glabella denticulata (Link, 1807)
 Marginella cherubini Bavay, 1922: synonym of Gibberula cherubini (Bavay, 1922)
 Marginella chrysea Watson, 1886: synonym of Hyalina perla (Marrat, 1876)
 Marginella chudeaui Bavay in Dautzenberg, 1910: synonym of Gibberula chudeaui (Bavay in Dautzenberg, 1910)
 Marginella cincta Kiener, 1834: synonym of Prunum cinctum (Kiener, 1834)
 Marginella cineracea Dall, 1889: synonym of Prunum cineraceum (Dall, 1889)
 Marginella cleo Bartsch, 1915: synonym of Volvarina bilineata (Krauss, 1848)
 Marginella columnaria Hedley & May, 1908: synonym of Hydroginella columnaria (Hedley & May, 1908)
 Marginella columnella Bavay in Dautzenberg, 1912: synonym of Gibberula columnella (Bavay in Dautzenberg, 1912)
 Marginella coma Odhner, 1924: synonym of Peculator porphyria (Verco, 1896)
 Marginella compressa Reeve, 1865: synonym of Volvarina compressa (Reeve, 1865)
 Marginella confortinii Bozzetti, 1992: synonym of Marginella epipolia Tomlin, 1921
 Marginella conoidalis Kiener, 1841: synonym of Prunum apicinum (Menke, 1828)
 Marginella consobrina May, 1911: synonym of Mesoginella consobrina (May, 1911)
 Marginella constricta Hinds, 1844: synonym of Prunum olivaeforme (Kiener, 1834)
 Marginella contaminata Gaskoin, 1849: synonym of Persicula blanda (Hinds, 1844)
 Marginella cracens Dell, 1956: synonym of Mesoginella cracens (Dell, 1956)
 Marginella crassa Röding, 1798: synonym of Prunum marginatum (Born, 1778)
 Marginella crassilabrum G. B. Sowerby I, 1846: synonym of Prunum labrosum (Redfield, 1870)
 Marginella crenilabra Bory de Saint-Vincent, 1824: synonym of Cryptospira strigata (Dillwyn, 1817)
 Marginella crescere Laseron, 1948: synonym of Alaginella ochracea (Angas, 1871)
 Marginella cumingiana Petit de la Saussaye, 1841: synonym of Marginella helmatina cumingiana Petit de la Saussaye, 1841
 Marginella cuneata Laseron, 1948: synonym of Dentimargo kemblensis (Hedley, 1903)
 Marginella curta G. B. Sowerby I, 1832: synonym of Prunum curtum (G. B. Sowerby I, 1832)
 Marginella cuvieri Deshayes, 1853: synonym of Bullata bullata (Born, 1778)
 Marginella cylichnella May, 1918: synonym of Balanetta cylichnella (May, 1918)
 Marginella cylindrica G. B. Sowerby II, 1846: synonym of Hyalina cylindrica (G.B. Sowerby II, 1846)
 Marginella cylindrica Pease, 1863: synonym of Marginella peasii Reeve, 1865
 Marginella cypraeacea Bory de Saint-Vincent, 1827: synonym of Persicula cornea (Lamarck, 1822)
 Marginella cypraeoides Tenison-Woods, 1878: synonym of Ovaginella ovulum (G. B. Sowerby II, 1846)
 Marginella cystiscus Redfield, 1870: synonym of Cystiscus cystiscus (Redfield, 1870)
 Marginella dactylus Lamarck, 1822: synonym of Cryptospira dactylus (Lamarck, 1822)
 Marginella dawnae Liltved & Millard, 1994: synonym of Marginella natalcinerea Massier, 1993
 Marginella deburghi Adams, 1864: synonym of Persicula deburghi (A. Adams, 1864)
 Marginella delessertiana Récluz, 1841: synonym of Hydroginella delessertiana (Récluz, 1841)
 Marginella deliciosa Bavay in Dautzenberg, 1912: synonym of Volvarina deliciosa (Bavay in Dautzenberg, 1912)
 Marginella delphinica Bavay, 1920: synonym of Dentimargo delphinica Bavay, 1920
 Marginella dens Reeve, 1865: synonym of Gibberula dens (Reeve, 1865)
 Marginella denticulata (Link, 1807): synonym of Glabella denticulata (Link, 1807)
 Marginella dentiens May, 1911: synonym of Dentimargo dentiens (May, 1911)
  † Marginella dentifera Lamarck, 1803: synonym of  † Dentimargo dentifera (Lamarck, 1803)
 Marginella destina Schwengel, 1943: synonym of Dentimargo eburneolus (Conrad, 1834)
 Marginella diaphana Kiener, 1841: synonym of Prunum pellucidum (Pfeiffer, 1840)
 Marginella differens E. A. Smith, 1904: synonym of Gibberula differens (E. A. Smith, 1904)
 Marginella dimidiata Thiele, 1925: synonym of Marginella piperata Hinds, 1844
 Marginella donovani Payraudeau, 1826: synonym of Erato voluta (Montagu, 1803)
 Marginella dozei Mabille & Rochebrune, 1889: synonym of Volvarina dozei (Mabille & Rochebrune, 1889)
 Marginella dunkeri Krauss, 1848: synonym of Volvarina dunkeri (Krauss, 1848)
 Marginella ealesae Powell, 1958: synonym of Volvarina ealesae (Powell, 1958)
 Marginella eburnea Preston, 1906: synonym of Marginella shacklefordi Preston, 1915: synonym of Canalispira shacklefordi (Preston, 1915)
 Marginella eburneola Conrad, 1834: synonym of Dentimargo eburneolus (Conrad, 1834)
 Marginella effulgens Reeve, 1865: synonym of Volvarina effulgens (Reeve, 1865)
 Marginella electrina G. B. Sowerby III, 1892: synonym of Hyalina electrina (G.B. Sowerby III, 1892)
 Marginella electrum Reeve, 1865: synonym of Rivomarginella electrum (Reeve, 1865)
 Marginella elegans (Gmelin, 1791): synonym of Cryptospira elegans (Gmelin, 1791)
 Marginella elliptica Redfield, 1870: synonym of Volvarina elliptica (Redfield, 1870)
 Marginella epigrus Reeve, 1865: synonym of Gibberula epigrus (Reeve, 1865)
 Marginella ergastula Dell, 1953: synonym of Mesoginella ergastula (Dell, 1953)
 Marginella esther Dall, 1927: synonym of Dentimargo esther (Dall, 1927)
 Marginella evanida G. B. Sowerby II, 1846: synonym of Volvarina evanida (G. B. Sowerby II, 1846)
 † Marginella evax Li, 1930 : synonym of Prunum sapotilla (Hinds, 1844)
 Marginella eveleighi Tom & Schackelford, 1913: synonym of Glabella tyermani (Marrat, 1876)
 Marginella evelynae Bayer, 1943: synonym of Prunum evelynae (F. M. Bayer, 1943)
 Marginella everardensis Gabriel, 1961: synonym of Alaginella vercoi (May, 1911)
 Marginella extra (Jousseaume, 1894): synonym of Extra extra Jousseaume, 1894
 Marginella faba (Linnaeus, 1758): synonym of Glabella faba (Linnaeus, 1758)
 Marginella fallax E. A. Smith, 1903: synonym of Canalispira fallax (E. A. Smith, 1903)
 Marginella fauna G. B. Sowerby I, 1846: synonym of Volvarina fauna (G.B. Sowerby I, 1846)
 Marginella fernandinae Dall, 1927: synonym of Eratoidea fernandinae (Dall, 1927)
 Marginella fischeri Bavay, 1903: synonym of Cryptospira fischeri (Bavay, 1903)
 Marginella flammea Link, 1807: synonym of Marginella nebulosa (Röding, 1798)
 Marginella flavida Redfield, 1846: synonym of Prunum apicinum (Menke, 1828)
 Marginella fluctuata C. B. Adams, 1850: synonym of Gibberula fluctuata (C. B. Adams, 1850)
 Marginella formicula Lamarck, 1822: synonym of Austroginella formicula (Lamarck, 1822)
 Marginella fulminata Kiener, 1841: synonym of Prunum fulminatum (Kiener, 1841)
 Marginella fumigata Gofas & Fernandes, 1994: synonym of Glabella fumigata (Gofas & Fernandes, 1994)
 Marginella fuscopicta Turton, 1932: synonym of Marginella piperata fuscopicta Turton, 1932
 Marginella fusiformis Hinds, 1844: synonym of Dentimargo fusiformis (Hinds, 1844)
 Marginella fusina Dall, 1881: synonym of Dentimargo fusinus (Dall, 1881)
 Marginella fusula Murdoch & Suter, 1906: synonym of Dentimargo fusula (Murdoch & Suter, 1906)
 Marginella gambiensis Redfield, 1851: synonym of Prunum amygdalum (Kiener, 1841)
 Marginella gatliffi May, 1911: synonym of Alaginella gatliffi (May, 1911)
 Marginella geminata Hedley, 1912: synonym of Alaginella geminata (Hedley, 1912)
 Marginella gibbosa Jousseaume, 1875: synonym of Prunum terverianum (Petit de la Saussaye, 1851)
 Marginella gigas Martens, 1904: synonym of Marginellona gigas (Martens, 1904)
 Marginella gorii T. Cossignani, 2012: synonym of Marginella gemma A. Adams, 1850
 Marginella goubini Bavay, 1922: synonym of Cystiscus goubini (Bavay, 1922)
 Marginella gracilis May, 1911: synonym of Dentimargo kemblensis (Hedley, 1903)
 Marginella gruveli Bavay in Dautzenberg, 1912: synonym of Gibberula gruveli (Bavay in Dautzenberg, 1912)
 Marginella guancha d'Orbigny, 1840: synonym of Granulina guancha (d'Orbigny, 1840)
 Marginella guillaini Petit de la Saussaye, 1851: synonym of Glabella obtusa (G. B. Sowerby II, 1846)
 Marginella haematita Kiener, 1834: synonym of Eratoidea hematita (Kiener, 1834)
 Marginella hainesi Petit de la Saussaye, 1851: synonym of Cryptospira ventricosa (Fischer von Waldheim, 1807)
 Marginella harpaeformis Sowerby II, 1846: synonym of Glabella harpaeformis (G.B. Sowerby II, 1846)
 Marginella hartleyana Schwengel, 1941: synonym of Prunum hartleyanum (Schwengel, 1941)
 Marginella haswelli Laseron, 1948: synonym of Volvarina haswelli (Laseron, 1948)
 Marginella hebescens Murdoch & Suter, 1906: synonym of Dentimargo hebescens (Murdoch & Suter, 1906)
 Marginella hedleyi May, 1911: synonym of Volvarina hedleyi (May, 1911)
 Marginella hematita Kiener, 1834: synonym of Eratoidea hematita (Kiener, 1834)
 Marginella henrikasi Bozzetti, 1995: synonym of Glabella henrikasi (Bozzetti, 1995)
 Marginella hera W. Turton, 1932: synonym of Plesiocystiscus aphanospira (Tomlin, 1913)
 Marginella herminea Jousseaume, 1875: synonym of Marginella ornata Redfield, 1870
 Marginella hesperia Sykes, 1905: synonym of Dentimargo hesperia (Sykes, 1905)
 Marginella hirasei Bavay, 1917: synonym of Volvarina hirasei (Bavay, 1917)
 Marginella hondurasensis Reeve, 1865: synonym of Prunum pulchrum (Gray, 1839)
 Marginella hyalina Thiele, 1912: synonym of Volvarina hyalina (Thiele, 1912)
 Marginella ignota Jousseaume, 1875: synonym of Dentimargo neglecta (G.B. Sowerby II, 1846)
 Marginella imitator Dall, 1927: synonym of Dentimargo imitator (Dall, 1927)
 Marginella immaculata Dall, 1890: synonym of Dentimargo aureocincta (Stearns, 1872): synonym of Dentimargo aureocinctus (Stearns, 1872)
 Marginella immersa Reeve, 1865: synonym of Cryptospira immersa (Reeve, 1865)
 Marginella imperatrix Sykes, 1905: synonym of Glabella pseudofaba (G.B. Sowerby II, 1846)
 Marginella incessa Dall, 1927: synonym of Dentimargo incessa (Dall, 1927)
 Marginella inconspicua G. B. Sowerby II, 1846: synonym of Mesoginella inconspicua (G. B. Sowerby, 1846)
 Marginella inepta Dall, 1927: synonym of Hyalina discors (Roth, 1974)
 Marginella inflexa Sowerby G.B. I, 1846: synonym of Volvarina mitrella (Risso, 1826)
 Marginella ingloria E. A. Smith, 1910: synonym of Volvarina ingloria (E. A. Smith, 1910)
 Marginella innocens Turton, 1932: synonym of Hyalina perla (Marrat, 1876)
 Marginella intermedia G. B. Sowerby II, 1846: synonym of Marginella floccata G. B. Sowerby III, 1889
 Marginella interrupta Lamarck, 1822: synonym of Persicula interruptolineata (Mühlfeld, 1816)
 Marginella iota Hedley, 1899: synonym of Cystiscus iota (Hedley, 1899)
 Marginella isabelae Borro, 1946: synonym of Volvarina isabelae (Borro, 1946)
 Marginella isseli G. Nevill & H. Nevill, 1875: synonym of Granulina isseli (G. Nevill & H. Nevill, 1875)
 Marginella ithychila Tomlin, 1918: synonym of Gibberula dulcis (E. A. Smith, 1904)
 Marginella jaspidea Schwengel, 1940: synonym of Eratoidea hematita (Kiener, 1834)
 Marginella jewettii Carpenter, 1857: synonym of Plesiocystiscus jewettii (Carpenter, 1857)
 Marginella johnstoni Petterd, 1884: synonym of Austroginella johnstoni (Petterd, 1884)
 Marginella jousseaumei Locard, 1897: synonym of Marginella subturrita P. Fischer, 1884
 Marginella jousseaumi Locard, 1897: synonym of Marginella subturrita P. Fischer, 1884
 Marginella jousseaumi Rochebrune, 1881: synonym of Prunum sauliae (G. B. Sowerby II, 1846): synonym of Volvarina sauliae (G. B. Sowerby II, 1846)
 Marginella judithae Dell, 1956: synonym of Mesoginella judithae (Dell, 1956)
 Marginella keenii Marrat, 1871: synonym of Hyalina keenii (Marrat, 1871)
 Marginella kemblensis Hedley, 1903: synonym of Dentimargo kemblensis (Hedley, 1903)
 Marginella keppeli Sykes, 1905: synonym of Glabella tyermani (Marrat, 1876)
 Marginella kerochuta Shackleford, 1914: synonym of Alaginella kerochuta (Shackleford, 1914)
 Marginella kieneriana Petit de la Saussaye, 1838: synonym of Pachybathron kienerianum (Petit de la Saussaye, 1838)
 Marginella kowiensis Turton, 1932: synonym of Alaginella atracta (Tomlin, 1918)
 Marginella labiata Kiener, 1841: synonym of Prunum labiatum (Kiener, 1841)
 Marginella labrosa Redfield, 1870: synonym of Prunum labrosum (Redfield, 1870)
 Marginella lachrimula Gould, 1862: synonym of Pugnus lachrimula (Gould, 1862)
 Marginella lactea Hutton, 1880: synonym of Austroginella muscaria (Lamarck, 1822)
 Marginella lactea Swainson, 1840: synonym of Prunum marginatum (Born, 1778)
 Marginella lactea Kiener, 1841: synonym of Volvarina abbreviata (C. B. Adams, 1850)
 Marginella laeta Jousseaume, 1875: synonym of Prunum olivaeforme (Kiener, 1834)
 Marginella laetitia Thiele, 1925: synonym of Volvarina laetitia (Thiele, 1925)
 Marginella laevigata Brazier, 1877: synonym of Protoginella lavigata (Brazier, 1877)
 Marginella laevilabris Jousseaume, 1875: synonym of Glabella faba (Linnaeus, 1758)
 Marginella laeviplicata Laseron, 1948: synonym of Alaginella ochracea (Angas, 1871)
 Marginella laevis (Donovan, 1804): synonym of Erato voluta (Montagu, 1803)
 Marginella langleyi G. B. Sowerby, 1892: synonym of Marginella mosaica Sowerby II, 1846
 Marginella lantzi Jousseaume, 1875: synonym of Dentimargo lantzi (Jousseaume, 1875)
 Marginella largillieri Kiener, 1841: synonym of Bullata largillieri (Kiener, 1841)
 Marginella larochei Powell, 1932: synonym of Mesoginella larochei (Powell, 1932)
 Marginella lasallei Talavera & Princz, 1985: synonym of Eratoidea lasallei (Talavera & Princz, 1985)
 Marginella lateritia Melvill & Sykes,1903: synonym of Dentimargo lateritia (Melvill & Sykes, 1903)
 Marginella lavalleeana d'Orbigny, 1842: synonym of Gibberula lavalleeana (d'Orbigny, 1842)
 Marginella lavigata Brazier, 1877: synonym of Protoginella lavigata (Brazier, 1877)
 Marginella leia Cotton, 1944: synonym of Mesoginella turbinata (G. B. Sowerby II, 1846)
 Marginella lepta Bartsch, 1915: synonym of Gibberula burnupi (G.B. Sowerby III, 1897)
 Marginella leptopus Carriere, 1880: synonym of Glabella adansoni (Kiener, 1834)
 Marginella lifouana Crosse, 1871: synonym of Gibberula lifouana (Crosse, 1871)
 Marginella lineata G. B. Sowerby III, 1889: synonym of Marginella piperata Hinds, 1844
 Marginella livida Hinds, 1844: synonym of Prunum apicinum (Menke, 1828)
 Marginella lodderae May, 1911: synonym of Dentimargo lodderae (May, 1911)
 Marginella loebbeckeana Weinkauff, 1878: synonym of Cryptospira praecallosa (Higgins, 1876)
 Marginella longivaricosa Lamarck, 1822: synonym of Prunum guttatum (Dillwyn, 1817)
 Marginella lorenzi Bozzetti, 1995: synonym of Marginella lineatolabrum Gaskoin, 1840
 Marginella loroisii Bernardi, 1857: synonym of Prunum saulcyanum (Petit de la Saussaye, 1851)
 Marginella louisae Bavay, 1913: synonym of Gibberula louisae (Bavay, 1913)
 Marginella lucani Jousseaume, 1884: synonym of Glabella lucani (Jousseaume, 1884)
 Marginella lucida Marrat, 1877: synonym of Hyalina lucida (Marrat, 1877)
 Marginella lurida Suter, 1908: synonym of Dentimargo lurida (Suter, 1908)
 Marginella majuscula Martens, 1877: synonym of Closia majuscula (Martens, 1877)
 Marginella malina Hedley, 1915: synonym of Alaginella malina (Hedley, 1915)
 Marginella manawatawhia Powell, 1937: synonym of Mesoginella manawatawhia (Powell, 1937)
 Marginella manceli (Jousseaume, 1875): synonym of Cystiscus manceli (Jousseaume, 1875)
 Marginella maoria Powell, 1937: synonym of Ovaginella maoria (Powell, 1937)
 Marginella maoriana Powell, 1932: synonym of Serrata maoriana (Powell, 1932)
 Marginella margarita Kiener, 1834: synonym of Eratoidea margarita (Kiener, 1834)
 Marginella margaritula Carpenter, 1857: synonym of Granulina margaritula (Carpenter, 1857)
 Marginella marginata (Born, 1778): synonym of Prunum marginatum (Born, 1778)
 Marginella marianae Bozzetti, 1999: synonym of Prunum pyrumoides Lussi & G. Smith, 1999
 Marginella martini Petit de la Saussaye, 1853: synonym of Prunum martini (Petit de la Saussaye, 1853)
 Marginella matthewsi Van Mol & Tursch, 1967: synonym of Bullata matthewsi (Van Mol & Tursch, 1967)
 Marginella maugeana Hedley, 1915: synonym of Dentimargo kemblensis (Hedley, 1903)
 Marginella mayii Tate, 1900: synonym of Dentimargo mayii (Tate, 1900)
 Marginella meta Thiele, 1925: synonym of Serrata meta (Thiele, 1925)
 Marginella metcalfei Angas, 1877: synonym of Alaginella ochracea (Angas, 1871)
 Marginella micans Petit de la Saussaye, 1851: synonym of Volvarina micans (Petit de la Saussaye, 1851)
 Marginella microgonia Dall, 1927: synonym of Cystiscus microgonia (Dall, 1927)
 Marginella microscopica May, 1911: synonym of Balanetta cylichnella (May, 1918)
 Marginella miliaria (Linnaeus, 1758): synonym of Gibberula miliaria (Linnaeus, 1758)
 Marginella miliaris (Linnaeus, 1758): synonym of Gibberula miliaria (Linnaeus, 1758)
 Marginella minima Petterd, 1884: synonym of Cystiscus angasi (Crosse, 1870)
 Marginella minor Tate & May, 1901: synonym of Austroginella johnstoni (Petterd, 1884)
 Marginella minuta Philippi, 1844: synonym of Gibberula philippii (Monterosato, 1878)
 Marginella minutissima Tenison-Woods, 1876: synonym of Cystiscus minutissimus (Tenison-Woods, 1876)
 Marginella mirabilis H. Adams, 1869: synonym of Glabella mirabilis (H. Adams, 1869)
 Marginella mixta Petter, 1884: synonym of Hydroginella mixta (Petterd, 1884)
 Marginella monilis (Linnaeus, 1758): synonym of Prunum monile (Linnaeus, 1758)
 Marginella montrouzieri Bavay, 1922: synonym of Cystiscus montrouzieri (Bavay, 1922)
 Marginella moscatelli Boyer, 1997: synonym of Marginella cloveri Rios & Matthews, 1972
 Marginella multizonata Krauss, 1848: synonym of Hyalina cylindrica (G.B. Sowerby II, 1846)
 Marginella muscaria Lamarck, 1822: synonym of Austroginella muscaria (Lamarck, 1822)
 Marginella mustelina Angas, 1871: synonym of Serrata mustelina (Angas, 1871)
 Marginella nana Marrat, 1877: synonym of Gibberula quadrifasciata (Marrat, 1873)
 Marginella narel Jousseaume, 1875: synonym of Glabella adansoni (Kiener, 1834)
 Marginella neglecta G. B. Sowerby II, 1846: synonym of Dentimargo neglecta (G.B. Sowerby II, 1846)
 Marginella neptuni W. Turton, 1932: synonym of Granulina grata (Thiele, 1925)
 Marginella nevilli Jousseaume, 1875: synonym of Volvarina nevilli (Jousseaume, 1875)
 Marginella nielseni Laseron, 1948: synonym of Cystiscus minutissimus (Tenison-Woods, 1876)
 Marginella nigrocrocea Barnard, 1969: synonym of Plesiocystiscus aphanospira (Tomlin, 1913)
 Marginella nimbosus S. G. Veldsman, 2013: synonym of Marginella nimbosa S. G. Veldsman, 2013
 Marginella nitida Hinds, 1844: synonym of Volvarina mitrella (Risso, 1826)
 Marginella nivea C. B. Adams, 1850: synonym of Prunum pruinosum (Hinds, 1844)
 Marginella nivosa Hinds, 1844: synonym of Prunum nivosum (Hinds, 1844)
 Marginella nobiliana Bayer, 1943: synonym of Prunum nobilianum (F. M. Bayer, 1943)
 Marginella nodata Hinds, 1844: synonym of Glabella nodata (Hinds, 1844)
 Marginella noduta [sic]: synonym of Glabella nodata (Hinds, 1844)
 Marginella nubeculata Lamarck, 1822: synonym of Marginella nebulosa (Röding, 1798)
 Marginella nubicola Swainson, 1840: synonym of Marginella nebulosa (Röding, 1798)
 Marginella oblonga Swainson, 1829: synonym of Prunum oblongum (Swainson, 1829)
 Marginella obscura Reeve, 1865: synonym of Volvarina obscura (Reeve, 1865)
 Marginella obtusa G. B. Sowerby II, 1870: synonym of Cryptospira grisea (Jousseaume, 1917)
 Marginella obtusa G.B. Sowerby II, 1846: synonym of Glabella obtusa (G. B. Sowerby II, 1846)
 Marginella occidua Cotton, 1944: synonym of Volvarina occidua (Cotton, 1944)
 Marginella occulta Monterosato, 1869: synonym of Granulina occulta (Monterosato, 1869)
 Marginella ochracea Angas, 1871: synonym of Alaginella ochracea (Angas, 1871)
 Marginella olivaeformis Kiener, 1834: synonym of Prunum olivaeforme (Kiener, 1834)
 Marginella olivella Reeve, 1865: synonym of Mesoginella olivella (Reeve, 1865)
 Marginella onychina A. Adams & Reeve, 1850: synonym of Cryptospira onychina (A. Adams & Reeve, 1850)
 Marginella opalina Stearns, 1872: synonym of Dentimargo eburneolus (Conrad, 1834)
 Marginella otagoensis Dell, 1956: synonym of Mesoginella otagoensis (Dell, 1956)
 Marginella ovalis Marrat, 1881: synonym of Cryptospira tricincta (Hinds, 1844)
 Marginella ovulum G. B. Sowerby II, 1846: synonym of Ovaginella ovulum (G. B. Sowerby II, 1846)
 Marginella ovum Reeve, 1865: synonym of Bullata largillieri (Kiener, 1841)
 Marginella pachia Watson, 1886: synonym of Triginella pachia (Watson, 1886)
 Marginella pallata Bavay in Dautzenberg, 1912: synonym of Gibberula pallata (Bavay in Dautzenberg, 1912)
 Marginella pallida (Linnaeus, 1767): synonym of Hyalina pallida (Linnaeus, 1758)
 Marginella paros Jousseaume, 1875: synonym of Bullata largillieri (Kiener, 1841)
 Marginella parsobrina Laseron, 1948: synonym of Mesoginella sinapi (Laseron, 1948)
 Marginella parvula Locard, 1897: synonym of Volvarina attenuata (Reeve, 1865)
 Marginella pattisoni Cotton, 1944: synonym of Mesoginella turbinata (G. B. Sowerby II, 1846)
 Marginella paumotensis Pease, 1868: synonym of Volvarina paumotensis (Pease, 1868)
 Marginella paxillas Paetel, 1883: synonym of Volvarina attenuata (Reeve, 1865)
 Marginella paxillus Reeve, 1865: synonym of Volvarina attenuata (Reeve, 1865)
 Marginella pellicula Weinkauff, 1879: synonym of Hyalina lucida (Marrat, 1877)
 Marginella pellucida Pfeiffer, 1840: synonym of Prunum pellucidum (Pfeiffer, 1840)
 Marginella pellucida Weinkauff, 1879: synonym of Volvarina fauna (G.B. Sowerby I, 1846)
 Marginella perexilis Bavay, 1922: synonym of Dentimargo perexilis (Bavay, 1922)
 Marginella pericalles Tomlin, 1916: synonym of Volvarina pericalles (Tomlin, 1916)
 Marginella perla Marrat, 1876: synonym of Hyalina perla (Marrat, 1876)
 Marginella perminima G. B. Sowerby III, 1894: synonym of Granulina perminima (G. B. Sowerby III, 1894)
 Marginella perrieri Bavay, 1906: synonym of Volvarina perrieri (Bavay, 1906)
 Marginella persicula Linnaeus, 1758: synonym of Persicula persicula (Linnaeus, 1758)
 Marginella persiculocingulata Tournier, 1997 : synonym of Persicula persiculocingulata (Tournier, 1997)
 Marginella petterdi Beddome, 1883 : synonym of Ovaginella ovulum (G. B. Sowerby II, 1846)
 Marginella philippii Monterosato, 1878 : synonym of Gibberula philippii (Monterosato, 1878)
 Marginella philippinarium Redfield, 1848: synonym of Volvarina philippinarum (Redfield, 1848)
 Marginella philtata Abbott, 1954 : synonym of Eratoidea hematita (Kiener, 1834)
 Marginella picta Dillwyn, 1817 : synonym of Marginella nebulosa (Röding, 1798)
 Marginella pisum Reeve, 1865: synonym of Balanetta pisum (Reeve, 1865)
 Marginella platypus Carriere, 1880 : synonym of Marginella glabella (Linnaeus, 1758)
 Marginella ponsonbyi G. B. Sowerby III, 1897 : synonym of Hyalina cylindrica (G.B. Sowerby II, 1846)
 Marginella poucheti Petit de la Saussaye, 1851 : synonym of Marginella glabella (Linnaeus, 1758)
 Marginella praecallosa Higgins, 1876 : synonym of Cryptospira praecallosa (Higgins, 1876)
 Marginella praiameliensis Fernandes & Alves, 1991 : synonym of Marginella carquejai Gofas & Fernandes, 1994
 Marginella princeps G. B. Sowerby III, 1901 : synonym of Closia princeps (G. B. Sowerby III, 1901)
 Marginella profunda Suter, 1909 : synonym of Ovaginella profunda (Suter, 1909)
 Marginella pruinosa Hinds, 1844 : synonym of Prunum pruinosum (Hinds, 1844)
 Marginella pseudofaba Sowerby II, 1846 : synonym of Glabella pseudofaba (G.B. Sowerby II, 1846)
 Marginella pseustes E. A. Smith, 1904 : synonym of Granulina pseustes (E. A. Smith, 1904) : synonym of Cystiscus pseustes (E. A. Smith, 1904)
 Marginella pulchella Kiener, 1834: synonym of Persicula pulchella (Kiener, 1834)
 Marginella pulchra Gray, 1839 : synonym of Prunum pulchrum (Gray, 1839)
 Marginella pumila Redfield, 1870: synonym of Dentimargo pumila Redfield, 1869
 Marginella punicea Laseron, 1948 : synonym of Gibberula agapeta (Watson, 1886)
 Marginella pupa Bavay, 1922 : synonym of Volvarina pupa (Bavay, 1922)
 Marginella pura E. A. Smith, 1904 : synonym of Alaginella zeyheri (Krauss, 1852)
 Marginella pygmaea G. B. Sowerby, 1846: synonym of Mesoginella pygmaea (G. B. Sowerby, 1846)
 Marginella pygmaea Issel, 1869 : synonym of Marginella isseli G. Nevill & H. Nevill, 1875 : synonym of Granulina isseli (G. Nevill & H. Nevill, 1875)
 Marginella pygmaeiformis Powell, 1937 : synonym of Mesoginella pygmaeiformis (Powell, 1937)
 Marginella pygmaeoides Singleton, 1937: synonym of Mesoginella pygmaeoides (Singleton, 1937)
 Marginella pygmora (Laseron, 1957) : synonym of Alaginella pygmora Laseron, 1957
 Marginella quadrifasciata Marrat, 1873 : synonym of Gibberula quadrifasciata (Marrat, 1873)
 Marginella quadrilineata Gaskoin, 1849 : synonym of Cryptospira quadrilineata (Gaskoin, 1849)
 Marginella quadrilineata Reeve, 1864 : synonym of Cryptospira quadrilineata (Gaskoin, 1849)
 Marginella quinqueplicata Lamarck, 1822 : synonym of Cryptospira ventricosa (Fischer von Waldheim, 1807)
 Marginella quinqueplicata Laseron, 1948 : synonym of Gibberula agapeta (Watson, 1886)
 Marginella radiata Lamarck, 1822 : synonym of Amoria zebra (Leach, 1814)
 Marginella redfieldii Tryon, 1883: synonym of Prunum redfieldii (Tryon, 1883)
 Marginella reducta Bavay, 1922 : synonym of Dentimargo reductus (Bavay, 1922)
 Marginella reeveana (Petit, 1851): synonym of Glabella reeveana (Petit de la Saussaye, 1851)
 Marginella reevei Krauss, 1852 : synonym of Dentimargo neglecta (G.B. Sowerby II, 1846)
 Marginella repentina Sykes, 1905 : synonym of Dentimargo repentina (Sykes, 1905)
 Marginella replicata Melvill, 1912 : synonym of Canalispira replicata (Melvill, 1912)
 Marginella rietensis Turton, 1932 : synonym of Hyalina lucida (Marrat, 1877)
 Marginella ringicula G. B. Sowerby III, 1901: synonym of Dentimargo rincigula (G. B. Sowerby III, 1901)
 Marginella roberti Bavay, 1917 : synonym of Volvarina roberti Bavay, 1917
 Marginella robusta G. B. Sowerby III, 1904 : synonym of Persicula robusta (G. B. Sowerby III, 1904)
 Marginella roosevelti Bartsch & Rehder, 1939 : synonym of Prunum amabile (Redfield, 1852)
 Marginella roscida Redfield, 1860 : synonym of Prunum roscidum (Redfield, 1860)
 Marginella rostrata Redfield, 1870 : synonym of Prunum rostratum (Redfield, 1870)
 Marginella rotunda Laseron, 1948: synonym of Ovaginella tenisoni (Pritchard, 1900)
 Marginella rubella C. B. Adams, 1845 : synonym of Volvarina rubella (C. B. Adams, 1845)
 Marginella rubens Martens, 1881 : synonym of Prunum rubens (Martens, 1881)
 Marginella rufanensis W. H. Turton, 1932: synonym of Gibberula rufanensis (W. H. Turton, 1932)
 Marginella ruffina Swainson, 1840 : synonym of Marginella glabella (Linnaeus, 1758)
 Marginella rufula Gaskoin, 1853 : synonym of Dentimargo neglecta (G.B. Sowerby II, 1846)
 Marginella sandwicensis Pease, 1860: synonym of Gibberula sandwicensis (Pease, 1860)
 Marginella sapotilla Hinds, 1844: synonym of Prunum sapotilla (Hinds, 1844)
 Marginella sarda Kiener, 1834: synonym of Closia sarda (Kiener, 1834)
 Marginella saulcyana Petit de la Saussaye, 1851: synonym of Prunum saulcyanum (Petit de la Saussaye, 1851)
 Marginella sauliae G. B. Sowerby II, 1846: synonym of Volvarina sauliae (G. B. Sowerby II, 1846)
 Marginella savignyi: synonym of  Gibberula savignyi Marginella scalaris Jousseaume, 1875: synonym of Eratoidea scalaris (Jousseaume, 1875)
 Marginella schoutanica May, 1913: synonym of Mesoginella schoutanica (May, 1913)
 Marginella scitula Turton, 1932: synonym of Marginella piperata Hinds, 1844
 Marginella scripta Hinds, 1844: synonym of Cryptospira scripta (Hinds, 1844)
 Marginella secalina Philippi, 1844: synonym of Volvarina mitrella (Risso, 1826)
 Marginella seminula Dall, 1881: synonym of Prunum abyssorum (Tomlin, 1916)
 Marginella serpentina Jousseaume, 1875: synonym of Marginella lussii Hayes & Millard, 1995
 Marginella serrata Gaskoin, 1849: synonym of Serrata serrata (Gaskoin, 1849)
 Marginella sexplicata Weinkauff, 1879: synonym of Cryptospira grisea (Jousseaume, 1917)
 Marginella shacklefordi Preston, 1915: synonym of Canalispira shacklefordi (Preston, 1915)
 Marginella shepstonensis E. A. Smith, 1906: synonym of Persicula shepstonensis (E. A. Smith, 1906)
 Marginella shorehami Pritchard & Gatliff, 1899: synonym of Cystiscus angasi (Crosse, 1870)
 Marginella simsoni Tate & May, 1900: synonym of Cystiscus angasi (Crosse, 1870)
 Marginella sinapi Laseron, 1948: synonym of Mesoginella sinapi (Laseron, 1948)
 Marginella sordida Reeve, 1865: synonym of Hydroginella sordida (Reeve, 1865)
 Marginella sowerbyana Petit de la Saussaye, 1851: synonym of Prunum monile (Linnaeus, 1758)
 Marginella splendens Reeve, 1842: synonym of Glabella reeveana (Petit de la Saussaye, 1851)
 Marginella spryi Clover, 1974: synonym of Serrata spryi (Clover, 1974)
 Marginella stewartiana Suter, 1908: synonym of Dentimargo stewartiana (Suter, 1908)
 Marginella stilla Hedley, 1903: synonym of Mesoginella stilla (Hedley, 1903)
 Marginella storeria Couthouy, 1837: synonym of Prunum storeria (Couthouy, 1837)
 Marginella strangei Angas, 1877: synonym of Mesoginella strangei (Angas, 1877)
 Marginella striata G. B. Sowerby II, 1846: synonym of Eratoidea sulcata (d'Orbigny, 1842)
 Marginella strigata G. B. Sowerby III, 1889: synonym of Marginella piperata Hinds, 1844
 Marginella suavis Souverbie, 1859: synonym of Dentimargo suavis (Souverbie, 1859)
 Marginella subamoena Powell, 1937: synonym of Dentimargo subamoena (Powell, 1937)
 Marginella subfusula Powell, 1932: synonym of Dentimargo subfusula (Powell, 1932)
 Marginella succinea Conrad, 1846: synonym of Prunum succineum (Conrad, 1846)
 Marginella sueziensis: synonym of  Gibberula sueziensis (Issel, 1869)
 Marginella sulcata d'Orbigny, 1842: synonym of Eratoidea sulcata (d'Orbigny, 1842)
 Marginella taeniata G. B. Sowerby II, 1846: synonym of Volvarina taeniata (G. B. Sowerby II, 1846)
 Marginella tasmanica Tenison-Woods, 1875: synonym of Austroginella tasmanica (Tenison-Woods, 1876)
 Marginella taylori Shackleford, 1916: synonym of Gibberula differens (E. A. Smith, 1904)
 Marginella tenisoni Pritchard, 1900: synonym of Ovaginella tenisoni (Pritchard, 1900)
 Marginella terveriana Petit de la Saussaye, 1851: synonym of Prunum terverianum (Petit de la Saussaye, 1851)
 Marginella thalia W. H. Turton, 1932: synonym of Plesiocystiscus thalia (W. H. Turton, 1932)
 Marginella thetis Turton, 1932: synonym of Marginella piperata Hinds, 1844
 Marginella thomensis Tomlin, 1919: synonym of Gibberula thomensis (Tomlin, 1919)
 Marginella tomlini Shackleford, 1916: synonym of Marginella bicatenata G. B. Sowerby III, 1914
 Marginella torticula Dall, 1881: synonym of Prunum torticulum (Dall, 1881)
 Marginella trailli Reeve, 1865: synonym of Cryptospira trailli (Reeve, 1865)
 Marginella translucida G. B. Sowerby II, 1846: synonym of Austroginella translucida (G. B. Sowerby II, 1846)
 Marginella tricincta Hinds, 1844: synonym of Cryptospira tricincta (Hinds, 1844)
 Marginella tridentata Tate, 1878: synonym of Hydroginella tridentata (Tate, 1878)
 Marginella triticea Lamarck, 1822: synonym of Volvarina exilis (Gmelin, 1791)
 Marginella tryphenensis Powell, 1932: synonym of Mesoginella tryphenensis (Powell, 1932)
 Marginella turbinata G. B. Sowerby II, 1846: synonym of Mesoginella turbinata (G. B. Sowerby II, 1846)
 Marginella turbiniformis Bavay, 1917: synonym of Protoginella turbiniformis (Bavay, 1917)
 Marginella turgidula Locard & Caziot, 1900: synonym of Gibberula turgidula (Locard & Caziot, 1900)
 Marginella turtoni Bartsch, 1915: synonym of Hyalina lucida (Marrat, 1877)
 Marginella tyermani Marrat, 1876: synonym of Glabella tyermani (Marrat, 1876)
 Marginella undulata Deshayes, 1844: synonym of Cryptospira strigata (Dillwyn, 1817)
 Marginella unifasciata Turton, 1932: synonym of Marginella munda E. A. Smith, 1904
 Marginella unilineata Jousseaume, 1875: synonym of Volvarina unilineata (Jousseaume, 1875)
 Marginella vailei Powell, 1932: synonym of Mesoginella vailei (Powell, 1932)
 Marginella valida Watson, 1886: synonym of Alaginella valida (Watson, 1886)
 Marginella veliei Pilsbry, 1896: synonym of Prunum succineum (Conrad, 1846)
 Marginella ventricosa Fischer von Waldheim, 1807: synonym of Cryptospira ventricosa (Fischer von Waldheim, 1807)
 Marginella ventricosa Hedley, 1903: synonym of Cryptospira ventricosa (Fischer von Waldheim, 1807)
 Marginella vercoi May, 1911: synonym of Alaginella vercoi (May, 1911)
 Marginella vermiculata Redfield, 1851: synonym of Cryptospira ventricosa (Fischer von Waldheim, 1807)
 Marginella victoriae Gatliff & Gabriel, 1908: synonym of Mesoginella victoriae (Gatliff & Gabriel, 1908)
 Marginella vignali Dautzenberg & Fischer, 1896: synonym of  Gibberula vignali (Dautzenberg & H. Fischer, 1896)
 Marginella vimonti Jousseaume, 1875: synonym of Glabella denticulata (Link, 1807)
 Marginella vincentiana Cotton, 1944: synonym of Hydroginella vincentiana (Cotton, 1944)
 Marginella virginea Jousseaume, 1875: synonym of Prunum apicinum (Menke, 1828)
 Marginella virginiana Verrill, 1885: synonym of Dentimargo smithii (A. E. Verrill, 1885)
 † Marginella virginiana (Conrad, 1868): synonym of † Prunum virginianum Conrad, 1868
 Marginella vittata Reeve, 1866: synonym of Marginella ornata Redfield, 1870
 Marginella vittata Hutton, 1873: synonym of Persicula cingulata (Dillwyn, 1817)
 Marginella volutiformis Reeve, 1865: synonym of Austroginella translucida (G. B. Sowerby II, 1846)
 Marginella walkeri E. A. Smith, 1899: synonym of Dentimargo walkeri (E. A. Smith, 1899)
 Marginella walvisiana Tomlin, 1920: synonym of Prunum walvisianum (Tomlin, 1920)
 Marginella warrenii Marrat, 1876: synonym of Volvarina warrenii (Marrat, 1876)
 Marginella watsoni Dall, 1881: synonym of Eratoidea watsoni (Dall, 1881)
 Marginella weedingi Cotton, 1944: synonym of Alaginella geminata (Hedley, 1912)
 Marginella whitechurchi W. Turton, 1932: synonym of Granulina grata (Thiele, 1925)
 Marginella woodbridgei Hertlein & Strong, 1951: synonym of Prunum woodbridgei (Hertlein & Strong, 1951)
 Marginella xanthostoma Mörch, 1852: synonym of Prunum pulchrum (Gray, 1839)
 Marginella xicoi Boyer, Ryall & Wakefield, 1999: synonym of Glabella xicoi (Boyer, Ryall & Wakefield, 1999)
 Marginella youngi Kilburn, 1977: synonym of Glabella youngi (Kilburn, 1977)
 Marginella yucatecana Dall, 1881: synonym of Dentimargo yucatecanus (Dall, 1881)
 Marginella zeyheri Krauss, 1852: synonym of Alaginella zeyheri (Krauss, 1852)
 Marginella zonata Kiener, 1841: synonym of Volvarina bilineata (Krauss, 1848)

Western Atlantic species

Western Africa species

Southern Africa species

Eastern Africa species

References

 Bartsch, P. 1915. Report on the Turton collection of South African marine mollusks, with additional notes on other South African shells contained in the United States National Museum. Bulletin of the United States National Museum, Issued 28 July 1915.
 Cossignani T. (2006). Marginellidae & Cystiscidae of the World''. L'Informatore Piceno. 408pp

External links 

 Malacolog (four Marginella species names are listed for the Western Atlantic Ocean, one name is not available). Malacolog is created by Dr. Gary Rosenberg, The Academy of Natural Sciences, Philadelphia

 
Taxa named by Jean-Baptiste Lamarck